Biljana Pawlowa-Dimitrova (Bulgarian: Биляна Павлова-Димитрова; born 20 January 1978) is a Bulgarian former professional tennis player. Her career-high WTA singles ranking is 490, which she reached on 16 October 2006. On 20 April 2009, she peaked at No. 301 in the doubles rankings. 

She was first called up to the Bulgaria Fed Cup team in 2009, but made her debut in 2010.

ITF Circuit finals

Singles: 6 (1 title, 5 runner–ups)

Doubles: 19 (3 titles, 16 runner–ups)

Fed Cup
Pawlowa-Dimitrova debuted for the Bulgaria Fed Cup team in 2010. Since then she has a 0–1 singles record and a 1–0 doubles record (1–1 overall).

Singles

Doubles

RR = Round Robin

References

External links
 
 
 

1978 births
Living people
Bulgarian female tennis players